Hubbard Street Dance Chicago is a contemporary dance company based in Chicago. Hubbard Street performs in downtown Chicago at the Harris Theater for Music and Dance and at the Edlis Neeson Theater at the Museum of Contemporary Art, Chicago. Hubbard Street also tours nationally and internationally throughout the year.

History 
Hubbard Street Dance Chicago grew out of the Lou Conte Dance Studio, when in 1977 several aspiring young artists approached dance teacher/choreographer Lou Conte to teach tap classes. At the time, the studio was located at the corner of LaSalle Street and Hubbard Street, which is how the company acquired its name. Conte served as director for 23 years, during which he developed relationships with choreographers including Lynne Taylor-Corbett, Margo Sappington, Daniel Ezralow, Nacho Duato, Jirí Kylián, and Twyla Tharp, all of whom helped shape Hubbard Street's repertoire.

In 2000, Jim Vincent became Artistic Director. Vincent worked to further expand the company's programming and repertoire. He introduced initiatives that have become staples of Hubbard Street's programming, including the "Inside/Out" Choreography Workshop, during which Hubbard Street dancers create original choreography for their peers; and the Choreographic Fellowship, which identifies and develops emerging choreographers from within the company. Dancers Alejandro Cerrudo and Robyn Mineko Williams, as well as Rehearsal Director Terence Marling have all developed works for the company. Dancer Penny Saunders choreographed a work for Hubbard Street 2 (the second company) through Hubbard Street's annual National Choreographic Competition.

In 2009, then Associate Artistic Director Glenn Edgerton became Artistic Director. Soon after, he named Alejandro Cerrudo Hubbard Street's first Resident Choreographer. Cerrudo has created ten works for the company. Since becoming Artistic Director, Edgerton has secured new commissions and repertoire hits by master and notable choreographers including Jirí Kylián, Nacho Duato, William Forsythe, Twyla Tharp, Ohad Naharin, Victor Quijada, Aszure Barton, and Sharon Eyal.

In 2021, former company dancer Linda-Denise Fisher-Harrell was named the fourth Artistic Director of Hubbard Street Dance Chicago. Season 44: RE/CHARGE marks her debut season as the artistic leader of the organization, with the goal of continuing to diversify the company’s repertoire and ensemble while building on the incredible legacy and reputation that HSDC has already established.

Main company 
Today, the main company consists of 14 dancers. While many contemporary dance companies are single-choreographer organizations, Hubbard Street has always been a repertory company, representing numerous choreographers and styles.

Hubbard Street has commissioned and presented almost 200 new and acquired dance works throughout its history.

Lou Conte Dance Studio 
Under the direction of the late Claire Bataille, one of the original four Hubbard Street dancers, Lou Conte Dance Studio (LCDS) offered weekly classes in ballet, jazz, modern, tap, African, hip hop, African drums, musical theater, yoga, Pilates, and Zumba at all levels from basic to professional, as well as workshops and master classes. LCDS also maintained a scholarship program for advanced dancers. LCDS closed in the spring of 2020.

Community partnerships
Since 2000, Hubbard Street has established partnerships with the Chicago Symphony Orchestra, presenting new and existing choreography set to orchestral music performed by the symphony; the Art Institute of Chicago; Illinois Institute of Technology School of Architecture; and Rush University Medical Center, which helped establish the Parkinson's Project, using contemporary dance techniques to improve the mobility and quality of life for participants.

Dancers

Hubbard Street Dance Chicago 
Source: Hubbard Street Dance Chicago
 
Aaron Choate
Abdiel Figueroa Reyes
Alexandria Best
Alysia Johnson
Cyrie Topete
David Schultz
Elliot Hammans
Jack Henderson
Jacqueline Burnett
Matt Wenckowski
Michele Dooley
Morgan Clune
Shota Miyoshi
Simone Stevens

References

External links
 
 "Expressing Themselves in New Ways: Hubbard Street Dance Chicago's Whole School Dance Program", National Endowment for the Arts, NEA Arts 2007, Volume 4
 SeeChicagoDance.com profile and list of upcoming performances
 Hubbard Street Dance Chicago performing in Nine Sinatra Songs in 1993 at Jacob's Pillow
 Hubbard Street Dance Chicago performing Untouched in 2010 at Jacob's Pillow
Hubbard Street Dance Chicago Records at the Newberry Library
Chicago Dance History Project: Gail Kalver
Chicago Dance History Project: Rick Hilsabeck

Performing groups established in 1977
Dance companies in Chicago